Gabbro Peak is an  mountain summit located in the Sierra Nevada mountain range, in Mono County of northern California, United States. The mountain is set in the Hoover Wilderness on land managed by Humboldt–Toiyabe National Forest. Gabbro Peak may be climbed from East Lake, or via the Virginia Pass Trail.

Climate
Gabbro Peak is located in an alpine climate zone. Most weather fronts originate in the Pacific Ocean, and travel east toward the Sierra Nevada mountains. As fronts approach, they are forced upward by the peaks  (orographic lift), causing moisture in the form of rain or snowfall to drop onto the range. Precipitation runoff from this mountain drains into headwaters of West Fork Green Creek which is a tributary of the Walker River.

See also

 List of mountain peaks of California

References

External links
 Weather forecast: Gabbro Peak

Mountains of Mono County, California
Mountains of Yosemite National Park
North American 3000 m summits
Mountains of Northern California
Sierra Nevada (United States)
Humboldt–Toiyabe National Forest